Aron of Kangeq (born in Kangeq, South Greenland on April 9, 1822; died March 12, 1869) was a Greenlandic Inuit hunter, painter, and oral historian. His woodcuts and watercolors are noted for their depiction of Inuit culture and history, and the often violent encounters between Inuit and Danish colonizers. His storytelling is known to children's literature in Greenland.

References 

Greenlandic Inuit people
Inuit painters
Oral historians of indigenous American culture
1822 births
1869 deaths
Greenlandic artists